Blood volume (volemia) is the volume of blood (blood cells and plasma) in the circulatory system of any individual.

Humans
A typical adult has a blood volume of approximately 5 liters, with females and males having approximately the same blood percentage by weight (approx 7 to 8%) Blood volume is regulated by the kidneys.

Blood volume (BV) can be calculated given the hematocrit (HC; the fraction of blood that is red blood cells) and plasma volume (PV), with the hematocrit being regulated via the blood oxygen content regulator:

Blood volume measurement may be used in people with congestive heart failure, chronic hypertension, kidney failure and critical care.

The use of relative blood volume changes during dialysis is of questionable utility.

Total Blood Volume can be measured manually via the Dual Isotope or Dual Tracer Technique, a classic technique, available since the 1950s. This technique requires double labeling of the blood; that is 2 injections and 2 standards (51Cr-RBC for tagging red blood cells and I-HAS for tagging plasma volume) as well as withdrawing and re-infusing patients with their own blood for blood volume analysis results. This method may take up to 6 hours for accurate results. The blood volume is 70 ml/kg body weight in adult males, 65 ml/kg in adult females and 70-75 ml/kg in children (1 year old and over).

Semi-automated system
Blood volume may also be measured semi-automatically. The BVA-100, a product of Daxor Corporation, is an FDA-cleared diagnostic used at leading medical centers in the United States which consists of an automated well counter interfaced with a computer. It is able to report with 98% accuracy within 60 minutes the Total Blood Volume (TBV), Plasma Volume (PV) and Red Cell Volume (RCV) using the indicator dilution principle, microhematocrit centrifugation and the Ideal Height and Weight Method. The indicator, or tracer, is an I-131 albumin injection. An equal amount of the tracer is injected into a known and unknown volume. Clinically, the unknown volume is the patient's blood volume, with the tracer having been injected into the patient's blood stream and tagged to the blood plasma. Once the tracer is injected a technician takes five blood samples which undergo microhematocrit centrifugation to extrapolate true blood volume at time 0. The concentration of the I-131 in the blood is determined from the blood radioactivity against the standard, which has a known I-131 dilution in a known volume. The unknown volume is inversely proportional to the concentration of the indicator in the known volume; the larger the unknown volume, the lower the tracer concentration, thus the unknown volume can be calculated. The microhematocrit data along with the I-131 indicator data provide a normalized hematocrit number, more accurate than hematocrit or peripheral hematocrit measurements. Measurements are taken 5 times at 6-minute intervals so that the BVA-100 can calculate the albumin transudation time to understand the flux of liquid through capillary membranes.

Blood volumes have also been measured in humans using the non-radioactive, carbon monoxide (CO) rebreathing technique for more than 100 years. With this technique, a small volume of pure CO gas is inhaled and rebreathed for a few minutes. During rebreathing, CO binds to hemoglobin present in red blood cells. Based on the increase in blood CO after the rebreathing period, the volume of blood can be determined through the dilution principle (i.e. similar as the case for radioactive tracer methods). Although CO gas in large volumes is toxic to humans, the volume used to access blood volumes corresponds to what would be inhaled when smoking one cigarette. While researchers typically use custom-made rebreathing circuits, the Detalo Performance from Detalo Health has fully automated the procedure and made the measurement available to a larger group of users.

Other animals

The table at right shows circulating blood volumes, given as volume per kilogram, for healthy adults and some animals. However, it can be 15% less in obese and old animals.

See also
 Volume status
 Hypovolemia
 Hypervolemia

References

External links
 

Blood
Mathematics in medicine
Cardiovascular physiology